Paramesonia is a Gram-negative, aerobic, rod-shaped and non-motile genus of bacteria from the family of Flavobacteriaceae with one known species (Paramesonia marina). Paramesonia marina has been isolated from deep-sea water from the Indian Ocean.

References

Flavobacteria
Bacteria genera
Monotypic bacteria genera
Taxa described in 2020